Lphant was a peer-to-peer file sharing client for the Microsoft Windows, Linux and Mac OS operating systems, which supports the eDonkey Network and the BitTorrent protocol. It was available in 19 languages. The name and logo of the original Lphant application has been replicated in a program called "Lphant 6.0" (see Domain Name Acquisition).

Features 
Lphant is a multi-network client, capable of searching for files by connecting to ed2k servers or through the emule source exchange and the kad network. Files can be downloaded simultaneously using the ed2k and BitTorrent protocols. Lphant supports various experimental ed2k features such as Protocol obfuscation, endgame althorithm and webcache, some of which are only found in eMule mods. However, some emule modders consider Lphant a leeching application and have therefore created algorithms which emulate their mods to Lphant when connecting to an Lphant client.

Domain Name Acquisition 
On March 9, 2009, Discordia Ltd, a Cyprus-based company, acquired the home page and the advertisement server of the original application, respectively lphant.com and adliveserver.com domains.

Instead of advertisements, current versions of the original application may display a message suggesting to users they should upgrade Lphant by installing an executable package named LphantV6.exe. Installing this package will result in removal of the original application and loss of eDonkey and BitTorrent connectivity. Users of the original Lphant application can prevent the display of such messages by blocking the ad.adliveserver.com domain using a hosts file or a firewall.

The web site has been redesigned using the same elephant-like logo of the original application. The similarity of names and graphics may have caused some download services to falsely advertise the eDonkey and BitTorrent connectivity of the original client while providing the non-original program for download.

See also 
 Comparison of eDonkey software

References

External links 

 
 
 The original Lphant 3.51 client, downloadable at Softonic.
 The sources for the last opensource version of lphant (1.0.1).

Windows-only freeware
BitTorrent clients
Proprietary freeware for Linux
File sharing software for Linux
C Sharp software